Tata Airport  is an airport serving Labé in Guinea.

The airport was formerly paved, but is now entirely grass/dirt due to plans to repave the entire runway that never occurred.

The Labe non-directional beacon (Ident: LB) is located on the field.

There are currently no scheduled passenger flights to Labé, but the airport received passengers up until the mid-2000s through regional carriers: Air Guinee and Union des Transports Africains (West Coast Airways).

See also

Transport in Guinea
List of airports in Guinea

References

External links
OpenStreetMap - Labé Airport
SkyVector - Labe Tata Airport
 OurAirports - Tata Airport

 Google Earth

Airports in Guinea